Mohammed Sadiq is a retired Pakistani diplomat.
Mohammad Sadiq was born in Zaida, District Swabi and spent his early childhood in Kunri in Sindh where his father Mohammad Salim was running several businesses.
Currently Ambassador Sadiq is Special Assistant to Prime Minister/Minister of State and Pakistan's Special Representative for Afghanistan. He is also Chairman/CEO of Sadiq Group of Enterprises and a member of BOG of Institute of Strategic Studies Islamabad.

He earlier served as Secretary National Security Division, Ambassador to Afghanistan, Spokesman of Foreign Office and several other diplomatic assignments to US, EU and China.
As Deputy Ambassador to the United States, Mr. Sadiq launched the first ever internship program by Government of Pakistan and conducted a comprehensive demographic study of Pakistani American community and worked with  Pakistan American community to establish the Pakistan Caucus at Capitol Hill.

References

Ambassadors of Pakistan to Afghanistan
Living people
School of International and Public Affairs, Columbia University alumni
University of Peshawar alumni
National Defence University, Pakistan alumni
Year of birth missing (living people)